David ben Joseph Pardo was a 17th-century rabbi. He was born in Amsterdam. His father was Rabbi Joseph Pardo (c. 1624 – 1677), hazzan in London and author of "Shulḥan Tahor."

Personal life 

He was married to Esther Abenatar.

Works 

He edited his father's work "Shulḥan Tahor" and also translated the work into Spanish under the title of "Compendio de Dinim" (Amsterdam, 1689). The other works attributed to him by Julius Fürst ("Bibliotheca Judaica" iii. 67) were written by David ben Jacob Pardo.

References 

17th-century Dutch rabbis
17th-century translators
Dutch Sephardi Jews
Hebrew–Spanish translators
Rabbis from Amsterdam
Place of death missing
Year of birth missing
Year of death missing